Cape Roquemaurel is a prominent rocky Antarctic headland at the east side of the entrance to Bone Bay, on the north side of Trinity Peninsula. Discovered by a French expedition, 1837–40, under Captain Jules Dumont d'Urville, and named by him for Lieutenant Gaston de Roquemaurel, second-in-command of the expedition ship Astrolabe.
 

Headlands of Trinity Peninsula